Stephen J. Tharp (born April 12, 1970) is an American organist. A critic for The Dallas Morning News wrote that he is "one of the most brilliant concert organists around these days."

Background 
Having graduated from Illinois College and Northwestern University, where he studied with Rudolf Zuiderveld and Wolfgang Rübsam, respectively, Tharp also studied privately in Paris with Jean Guillou. He has performed extensively, having gone on more than 32 solo tours, and given over 800 concerts in North America alone. Additionally, he has given masterclasses at Yale University, Westminster Choir College, Cleveland Institute of Music, and other venues, as well as served on jurys for competitions at Juilliard and Northwestern University. Tharp has recorded numerous CDs, including the complete organ works of Jeanne Demessieux, which won him the Preis der Deutschen Schallplattenkritik.

From 1995 to 1997, he was the organist at St. Patrick's Cathedral. From 1998 to 2002, he was Associate Organist at St. Bartholomew's. During the 2013/2014 season, he was Artist-in-Residence at the Grace Church in Manhattan. In 2008, Tharp was appointed as the official organist for the New York visit of Pope Benedict XVI. Tharp is listed in the Who's Who in America and Who's Who in the World. He was also featured in a number of full programs on American Public Media's Pipedreams. In addition, he was awarded the 2011 International Performer of the Year by the New York City chapter of the American Guild of Organists.

In addition to being a composer and transcriber in his own right, Tharp is a frequent performer of modern works, having premiered works by Philip Moore, Anthony Newman, Thierry Escaich, and others.

Since November 2014, he has been Artist-in-Residence at St. James' Church Madison Avenue in New York City.

References

External links 
 

1970 births
American organists
American male organists
Living people
21st-century organists
21st-century American male musicians
21st-century American keyboardists